Batote is a town and a notified area committee, near Ramban town in Ramban district of Indian union territory of Jammu and Kashmir on NH 44 (former name NH 1A) just beyond Ramban, Patnitop while going towards Srinagar.

Tourism
It has an average elevation of 1,555 metres (6,584 feet).

Batote is very green and has many mountains. People of this town is so friendly. It also has a small city centre where you can find many necessary things. You can spend your summers here; it hardly reaches 32°C in summer. Snowfall in winter every year makes this place really awesome. Some famous picnic spots Patnitop and Sanasar are located 14 km and 32 km from Batote and an unexplored beautiful location known as shiv garh located near Batote but we can reach there only by trekking.

Demographics

 census, Batote had a population of 4,315. Males constitute 55% of the population and females 45%. Batote has an average literacy rate of 71%, higher than the national average of 59.5%; with 60% of the males and 40% of females literate. 8% of the population is under 6 years of age.

Climate

Transport

Road
Batote is well-connected by road to other places in Jammu and Kashmir and India by the NH 44.

Rail
Batote is not connected with railways. The nearest railway station is Udhampur railway station located at a distance of 43 kilometres.

Air
The nearest airport is Jammu Airport located at a distance of 112 kilometres.

See also
Jammu and Kashmir
Banihal
Ramban
Doda

References

Cities and towns in Ramban district